East Rand Proprietary Mines (ERPM) is a 125-year-old underground gold mining operation on the Witwatersrand Basin at Boksburg, to the east of Johannesburg. The mine employed 3,850 people. It was the deepest mine in the world until 2008 at 3,585 metres depth, slightly more than the TauTona mine, also in South Africa, which was 3,581 metres at the time (in 2008 the TauTona mine completed a digging project that extended the depth of the mine by several hundred metres.)

The mine closed in 2008. Historical gold production between 1896 and 2008 was 43 Moz at recovered gold grade of 8.1g/t (95% plant recovery).

A world class high grade gold deposit remains with existing in situ resources (SAMREC compliant) of 63 Moz, including;
- Measured & Indicated resource of 13.6 Moz at 6.7g/t Au
- Inferred resources of 50 Moz at 4.92 g/t Au.

The Cason mine dump was once the world’s highest manmade mountain. This dump is currently being recycled. It is now a shadow of its former self and will probably disappear in the near future.

Production
Recent production figures:

History 

The ERPM engineered many mining techniques which are still in place today, including "Long Wall Mining". The mine also built the world's largest ice factory which produced up to 8,000t of ice daily to cool wall rock temperatures (50-60 deg Celsius).

The mine was acquired by private Malaysian mining company OroTree Limited on 26 February 2019.

References 

 Tucker, Rodney & Viljoen, Richard & J. Viljoen, Morris. (2016). A Review of the Witwatersrand Basin - The World's Greatest Goldfield. Episodes. 39. 105. 10.18814/epiiugs/2016/v39i2/95771.

External links 
Details from NGD Iran
InfoMine listing

 OroTree acquires ERPM GOLD MINE 
 Malaysian Explorer acquires ERPM Gold Mine 

Gold mines in South Africa
Buildings and structures in Gauteng
Underground mines in South Africa
Economy of Ekurhuleni